Daniele Ratto (born 5 October 1989) is an Italian former professional road bicycle racer, who rode professionally between 2010 and 2016 for the , , ,  ,  and  teams.

Personal life
Ratto was born in Moncalieri; his sister, Rossella Ratto, also competed professionally, best known for finishing third in the 2013 World Road Race Championships.

Major results

2006
 1st Overall Giro della Lunigiana (juniors)
1st Stage 1
 1st Overall Tour du Pays de Vaud (juniors)
1st Stages 2a & 3
 2nd Trofeo Buffoni (juniors)
2007
 2nd  Road race, UCI Juniors World Championships
 2nd Overall Giro della Lunigiana (juniors)
1st Stage 1
 2nd Trofeo Emilio Paganessi (juniors)
 3rd Road race, National Junior Road Championships
2008
 1st Piccolo Giro di Lombardia
 4th Overall Giro della Valle d'Aosta
 4th GP Inda – Trofeo Aras Frattini
 10th Paris–Tours Espoirs
2009
 3rd Gran Premio Palio del Recioto
 4th Firenze–Viareggio
 6th Overall Giro della Valle d'Aosta
 6th Cronoscalata Gardone Valtrompia
 7th Gran Premio della Liberazione
2010
 1st GP Industria & Artigianato di Larciano
 6th Gran Premio Nobili Rubinetterie – Coppa Città di Stresa
 7th Coppa Bernocchi
2011
 2nd Gran Premio de Llodio
 4th Trofeo Melinda
 5th Vuelta a La Rioja
 7th Coppa Ugo Agostoni
 8th Giro di Toscana
 10th Gran Premio dell'Insubria-Lugano
2012
 6th Circuito de Getxo
 8th Overall Tour of Slovenia
 9th Rund um den Finanzplatz Eschborn-Frankfurt
2013
 Vuelta a España
1st Stage 14
 Held on Stage 15
 9th GP Miguel Induráin
 10th Gran Premio della Costa Etruschi
2015
 3rd Classica Corsica
2016
 3rd Overall Vuelta a la Comunidad de Madrid
 4th Overall Tour of Bihor
 6th Paris–Camembert
 9th Giro dell'Appennino

References

External links

Liquigas-Cannondale profile

Cycling Quotient profile

Italian male cyclists
1989 births
Living people
People from Moncalieri
Italian Vuelta a España stage winners
Cyclists from Piedmont
Sportspeople from the Metropolitan City of Turin